Thomas Rosling Howlett (1827–1898) was a Baptist pastor and early proponent of British Israelism. He authored Anglo-Israel, the Jewish problem (1892) considered one of the most influential works on the British-Israel teaching.

See also

Edward Hine
William H. Poole

References 

British Israelism
1827 births
1898 deaths
British religious writers